Jens-Lys Michel Cajuste (born 10 August 1999), better known as Jens Cajuste, is a Swedish professional footballer who plays as a midfielder for Ligue 1 club Reims and the Sweden national team.

Club career

Early career
Cajuste was born in Sweden to a Haitian-American father and a Swedish mother. He moved to China with his family at age five, living one year in Luoyang before moving to Beijing. There, he began football career with Chinese Sports Beijing. A few years later, the family returned to Sweden. As a ten-year-old, Cajuste started playing for Örgryte IS. After impressing in the club's youth teams, he was rewarded with a senior contract in 2016. On 17 October 2016, Cajuste made his senior debut for Örgryte in the Superettan in a 4–1 loss to IK Sirius.

Midtjylland
In June 2018, Cajuste moved to Denmark’s Midtjylland, where he signed a five-year contract. He made his debut for the club on 26 August 2018 in a match against Randers. His first goal also came against Randers, which also proved to be the winner, in a 2–1 league victory on 21 October 2019.

On 21 October 2020, he made his UEFA Champions League debut in a group stage home game against Atalanta, which Midtjylland lost 4–0.

Reims
On 10 January 2022, Cajuste signed for French club Reims in a transfer deal worth a reported €10 million. He became the club's record signing. A few days later, Reims director-general Mathieu Lacour disputed the reported fee, stating that the price was around half of what Midtjylland had announced. 

Cajuste made his debut for Reims in the Ligue 1 match against FC Metz on 16 January 2022, starting in central midfield before being substituted off for Alexis Flips at half-time, as Reims lost 1–0.

International career 
On 4 November 2020, Cajuste was called up to the Sweden national team for their friendly game against Denmark and UEFA Nations League games against Croatia and France. He made his international debut in a 2–0 loss against Denmark on 12 November 2020.

Cajuste was called up for a major tournament for the first time when he was included in Sweden's 26-man squad for UEFA Euro 2020.

Career statistics

Club

International

Honours
Midtjylland
 Danish Superliga: 2019–20

References

External links 
 
 

1999 births
Living people
Footballers from Gothenburg
Association football midfielders
Swedish footballers
Sweden under-21 international footballers
Sweden international footballers
Swedish people of Haitian descent
Swedish people of American descent
Örgryte IS players
FC Midtjylland players
Stade de Reims players
Danish Superliga players
Superettan players
Ligue 1 players
UEFA Euro 2020 players
Swedish expatriate footballers
Expatriate footballers in China
Expatriate men's footballers in Denmark
Expatriate footballers in France
Swedish expatriate sportspeople in China
Swedish expatriate sportspeople in Denmark
Swedish expatriate sportspeople in France